Marion County Jail and Jailor's House, also known as the Palmyra Jail and Palmyra Massacre Jail, is a historic jail and sheriff's residence located at Palmyra, Marion County, Missouri.  It was built in 1858, and is a two-story, three bay, Greek Revival style brick I-house with a broad two story limestone ell. It features a full-width, one story front porch supported by smooth tampering Doric order columns.  The building housed the ten men, accused of being Confederate partisans, who were selected by Union authorities to be executed in reprisal for the disappearance of a local Union supporter.  Referred to as the Palmyra massacre, the accused were executed on October 18, 1862.

It was added to the National Register of Historic Places in 2002.

See also 
 Henry County Courthouse, Jail, and Warden's House
 National Register of Historic Places listings in Marion County, Missouri

References

Government buildings on the National Register of Historic Places in Missouri
Greek Revival architecture in Missouri
Government buildings completed in 1858
Buildings and structures in Marion County, Missouri
National Register of Historic Places in Marion County, Missouri